Baseball Hall of Fame most commonly refers to:
 The National Baseball Hall of Fame and Museum, honoring those involved in professional baseball in the United States.

The term may also refer to one of the following institutions honoring baseball:
 The Baseball Australia Hall of Fame, honoring those involved in amateur and professional Australian baseball.
 The Canadian Baseball Hall of Fame, honoring those involved in amateur and professional Canadian baseball.
 The Caribbean Baseball Hall of Fame, honoring those involved in amateur and professional baseball in the Caribbean nations.
 The Cuban Baseball Hall of Fame, honoring those involved in amateur and professional Cuban baseball.
 The Hispanic Heritage Baseball Museum Hall of Fame, honoring the contributions made to baseball by Hispanic players.
 The Japanese Baseball Hall of Fame (Yakyū Dendō), honoring those involved in professional Japanese baseball.
 Meikyukai (The Golden Players Club), honoring players of the Japanese professional leagues from the 1926–1988 era. 
 The Mexican Professional Baseball Hall of Fame, honoring those involved in professional Mexican baseball.
 The National College Baseball Hall of Fame, honoring those involved in collegiate baseball in the United States.
 The Negro Leagues Baseball Museum, dedicated to preserving the history of Negro league baseball in America.
 The Venezuelan Baseball Hall of Fame and Museum, honoring those involved in professional Venezuelan baseball.